Letícia Oliveira (born November 21, 1976) is a Cape Verdean female basketball player.

External links
Profile at fiba.com

1976 births
Living people
Basketball players from Milan
Cape Verdean women's basketball players
Italian women's basketball players